Bank Islam Brunei Darussalam is an Islamic Bank in Brunei. Established in 2005 with the merger of Islamic Bank of Brunei and Islamic Development Bank of Brunei, it is based in Bandar Seri Begawan.

References

External links 

Banks of Brunei
Banks established in 2005
2005 establishments in Brunei
Economy of Brunei